Nicandro Breeveld  (born 7 October 1986) is a Surinamese professional footballer who plays as a defensive midfielder.

Club career

Almere City
Breeveld started his professional career with Almere City in the Dutch Eerste Divisie, after he joined them from amateur side Zeeburgia. In 2008 he moved to Telstar, where he played until 2010, when he switched to the Romanian leagues.

Gaz Metan Mediaș
Breeveld played half a season in the Romanina Liga II with Jiul Petroșani. After only 15 games, in which he scored 4 goals, he moved to Liga I side Gaz Metan Mediaș. Breeveld played in the 2011–12 UEFA Europa League campaign with his new club. He played in 6 games along the way as they eliminated KuPS, Mainz and eventually got eliminated by Austria Wien. He scored the only goal in the away game against Austria Wien, where Gaz Metan Mediaș lost 3–1 and got knocked out of the competition.

Steaua București
On 11 August 2014, he signed a two-year contract with FC Steaua București and won the 2014–15 Liga I title with the club. He was removed from the team roster after refusing to extend his contract in October 2015.

Dibba Al-Fujairah
In summer 2016, Breeveld moved to United Arab Emirates side Dibba Al-Fujairah.

Omonia Nicosia
In the winter of 2017, he moved to Cypriot club Omonia Nicosia.

Politehnica Iași
On 11 July 2019, Breeveld returned to the Romanian championship after putting pen to paper on a two-year deal with Liga I club Politehnica Iași.

Career statistics 
Statistics accurate as of match played 19 August 2019

Club

Honours

Club
Steaua București
Liga I: 2014–15
Cupa României: 2014–15
Cupa Ligii: 2014–15, 2015–16

References

External links
 voetbal football bio
Profile at Uefa.com

1986 births
Living people
Sportspeople from Paramaribo
Association football midfielders
Surinamese footballers
Dutch footballers
Surinamese emigrants to the Netherlands
Naturalised citizens of the Netherlands
Almere City FC players
SC Telstar players
CSM Jiul Petroșani players
CS Gaz Metan Mediaș players
CS Pandurii Târgu Jiu players
FC Steaua București players
Dibba FC players
Al-Markhiya SC players
FC Politehnica Iași (2010) players
Eerste Divisie players
Liga I players
Surinamese expatriate footballers
Dutch expatriate footballers
Expatriate footballers in Romania
Dutch expatriate sportspeople in Romania
Expatriate footballers in the United Arab Emirates
Dutch expatriate sportspeople in the United Arab Emirates
Expatriate footballers in Cyprus
Dutch expatriate sportspeople in Cyprus
UAE Pro League players
Qatari Second Division players
Expatriate footballers in Qatar
Dutch expatriate sportspeople in Qatar